Vaikom Road railway station (Code: VARD) is a railway station in Kottayam district, Kerala and falls under the Thiruvananthapuram railway division of the Southern Railway zone, Indian Railways.

It is one of the few railway stations in between Kottayam and Ernakulam where most of the long-distance trains halt for at least one minute.

Railway stations in Kottayam district
Railway stations opened in 1904
1904 establishments in India
Vaikom